The Chisum House is a historic house at 1320 South Cumberland Street in Little Rock, Arkansas.  It is a two-story frame structure, with a hip roof and an exterior sheathed in clapboards and decorative cut shingles.  The roof is capped by a pair of finials, and there is a three-story square tower angled at one corner, topped by a bellcast roof and finial.  The design is varied in the Queen Anne style, with multiple sizes and configurations of windows and porches, the latter featuring turned woodwork.  Built in 1894, it is one of the city's relatively few Queen Anne Victorians.  It was built for Jason Sowell, one of the city's leading families, in what was then its most exclusive neighborhood.

The house was listed on the National Register of Historic Places in 1975.

See also
National Register of Historic Places listings in Little Rock, Arkansas

References

Houses on the National Register of Historic Places in Arkansas
Queen Anne architecture in Arkansas
Houses completed in 1894
Houses in Little Rock, Arkansas
National Register of Historic Places in Little Rock, Arkansas
Historic district contributing properties in Arkansas